Tevita Waranaivalu (born 16 September 1995) is a Fijian footballer who plays as an attacking midfielder for Rewa in the Fiji National Football League.

Early career
Waranaivalu started playing football at an early age and was a football player for his high school team Saraswati College in Nausori.
He came up through the Rewa FC youth system and made his first-team debut at the age of 18 in 2013. In January 2018 he moved to Suva.

International career
Waranaivalu was a member of Fiji's U-20 national team at the 2015 FIFA U-20 World Cup in New Zealand. It was the first time that Fiji had qualified for a FIFA event.  During the tournament, he played all in three games, including in the historical 3–0 victory over Honduras.
Waranaivalu made his debut for the Fiji national football team in a 5–0 victory against Tonga on August 19, 2015. He was also part of the Fijian team at the 2016 OFC Nations Cup. On 16 July 2016, Waranaivalu was named in Fiji's 18-man squad for the 2016 Summer Olympics in Rio de Janeiro.

International goals

References

External links

1995 births
Living people
Fijian footballers
Rewa F.C. players
Association football midfielders
Fiji international footballers
2016 OFC Nations Cup players
Footballers at the 2016 Summer Olympics
Olympic footballers of Fiji